Gigi Fernández and Martina Navratilova were the defending champions, but Navratilova could not compete this year due to a flu. Fernández teamed up with Robin White and lost in the semifinals to Chris Evert Lloyd and Wendy Turnbull.

Pam Shriver and Helena Suková won the title by defeating Evert Lloyd and Turnbull 6–2, 6–3 in the final.

Seeds

Draw

Finals

Top half

Section 1

Section 2

Bottom half

Section 3

Section 4

References

External links
 Official results archive (ITF)
 Official results archive (WTA)

Women's Doubles
1986 Virginia Slims World Championship Series